Tribeca, originally written as TriBeCa, is a neighborhood in Lower Manhattan in New York City.  Its name is a syllabic abbreviation of "Triangle Below Canal Street". The "triangle" (more accurately a quadrilateral) is bounded by Canal Street, West Street, Broadway, and Chambers Street.  By the 2010s, a common marketing tactic was to extend Tribeca's southern boundary to either Vesey or Murray streets to increase the appeal of property listings.

The neighborhood began as farmland, then was a residential neighborhood in the early 19th century, before becoming a mercantile area centered on produce, dry goods, and textiles, and then transitioning to artists and then actors, models, entrepreneurs and other celebrities. The neighborhood is home to the Tribeca Festival, which was created in response to the September 11 attacks, to reinvigorate the neighborhood and downtown after the destruction caused by the terrorist attacks.

Tribeca is part of Manhattan Community District 1, and its primary ZIP Codes are 10007 and 10013. It is patrolled by the 1st Precinct of the New York City Police Department.

Name
Tribeca is one of a number of neighborhoods in New York City whose names are syllabic abbreviations or acronyms, including SoHo (South of Houston Street), NoHo (North of Houston Street), Nolita (North of Little Italy), NoMad (North of Madison Square), DUMBO (Down Under the Manhattan Bridge Overpass), and BoCoCa, the last of which is actually a collection of neighborhoods (Boerum Hill, Cobble Hill and Carroll Gardens).

The name was coined in the early 1970s and originally applied to the area bounded by Broadway and Canal, Lispenard, and Church Streets. which appears to be a triangle on city planning maps.  Residents of this area formed the TriBeCa Artists' Co-op in filing legal documents connected to a 1973 zoning dispute.  According to a local historian, the name was misconstrued by a newspaper reporter as applying to a much larger area, which is how it came to be the name of the current neighborhood.

History

Early history 
The area now known as Tribeca, or TriBeCa, was farmed by Dutch settlers to New Amsterdam, prominently Roeleff Jansen  (who obtained the land patent, called Dominie's Brouwery, from Wouter van Twiller in 1636) and his wife Anneke Jans who later married Everardus Bogardus. The land stayed with the family until 1670 when the deed was signed over to Col. Francis Lovelace. In 1674 the Dutch took possession of the area until the English reclaimed the land a year later. In 1674, representing the Duke of York, Governor Andros took possession of the land.

Tribeca was later part of the large tract of land given to Trinity Church by Queen Anne in 1705.  In 1807, the church built St. John's Chapel on Varick Street and then laid out St. John's Park, bounded by Laight Street, Varick Street, Ericsson Place, and Hudson Street.  The church also built Hudson Square, a development of brick houses which surrounded the park, which would become the model for Gramercy Park. The area was among the first residential neighborhoods developed in New York City beyond the city's colonial boundaries, and remained primarily residential until the 1840s.

Several streets in the area are named after Anthony Lispenard Bleecker and the Lispenard family. Beach Street was created in the late 18th century and was the first street on or adjacent to the farm of Anthony Lispenard Bleecker, which was just south of what is now Canal Street; the name of the street is a corruption of the name of Paul Bache, a son-in-law of Anthony Lispenard. Lispenard Street in Tribeca is named for the Lispenard family, and Bleecker Street in NoHo was named for Anthony Lispenard Bleecker.

Commercial and industrial development 
During the 1840s and then continuing after the American Civil War, shipping in New York City – which then consisted only of Manhattan – shifted in large part from the East River and the area around South Street to the Hudson River, where the longer piers could more easily handle the larger ships which were then coming into use.  In addition, the dredging of the sand bars which lay across the entrance to New York Harbor from the Atlantic Ocean made it easier for ships to navigate to the piers on the Hudson, rather than use the "back door" via the East River to the piers there.  Later, the Hudson River piers also received freight via railroad cars ferried across the river from New Jersey.

The increased shipping encouraged the expansion of the Washington Market – a wholesale produce market which opened in 1813 as "Bear Market" – from the original market buildings to buildings throughout its neighborhood, taking over houses and warehouses to use for the storage of produce, including butter, cheese and eggs. In the mid-19th century, the neighborhood was the center of the dry goods and textile industries in the city, and St. John's Park was turned into a freight depot. Later, the area also featured fireworks outlets, pets stores, radios – which were clustered in a district which was displaced by the building of the World Trade Center – sporting goods, shoes, and church supplies. By the mid-19th century the area transformed into a commercial center, with large numbers of store and loft buildings constructed along Broadway in the 1850s and 1860s.

Development in the area was further spurred by New York City Subway construction, namely the extension of the IRT Broadway – Seventh Avenue Line (today's ), which opened for service in 1918, and the accompanying extension of Seventh Avenue and the widening of Varick Street during subway construction in 1914, both of resulted in better access to the area for vehicles and for subway riders. The area was also served by the IRT Ninth Avenue Line, an elevated train line on Greenwich Street demolished in 1940.

After the construction of the Holland Tunnel from 1920 to 1927, and the transition of freight shipping from ships and railroads to trucks, the truck traffic generated by the market and other businesses caused considerable congestion in the area. This provoked the building between 1929 and 1951 of the Miller Highway, an elevated roadway which came to be called the West Side Highway, the purpose of which was to handle through automobile traffic, which thus did not have to deal with the truck congestion at street level.  Because of a policy of "deferred maintenance", the elevated structure began to fall apart in the late 1960s and early 1970s, and the highway was shut down in 1973. The roadway project planned to replace it, called Westway, was fought by neighborhood activists, and was eventually killed by environmental concerns.  Instead, West Street was rebuilt to handle through traffic.

Redevelopment 
By the 1960s, Tribeca's industrial base had all but vanished, and the produce market moved to Hunts Point in the Bronx in the 1960s. The city put an urban renewal plan into effect which involved the demolition of many old buildings, with the intent of building high-rise residential towers, office buildings and schools.  Some of these were constructed, including Independence Plaza in 1975 on Washington Street, the Borough of Manhattan Community College in 1980, and Washington Market Park in 1981. Some warehouse buildings were converted to residential use, and lofts began to be utilized by artists, who lived and worked in their spaces, a model which had been pioneered in nearby SoHo. In the early 1970s, a couple of years after artists in SoHo were able to legalize their live/work situation, artist and resident organizations in the area to the south, known then as "Washington Market" or the "Lower West Side", sought to gain similar zoning status for their neighborhood. One of the neighborhood groups called themselves the "Triangle Below Canal Block Association," and, as activists had done in SoHo, shortened the group’s name to the Tribeca Block Association. The Tribeca name came to be applied to the area south of Canal Street, between Broadway and West Street, extending south to – as variously defined – Chambers, Vesey, or Murray Street.

In 1996, the Tribeca Open Artist Studio Tour was founded as a non-profit, artist-run organization with the mission to empower the working artists of Tribeca while providing an educational opportunity for the public. For 15 years, the annual free walking tour through artist studios in Tribeca has allowed people to get a unique glimpse into the lives of Tribeca's best creative talent.  Tribeca suffered both physically and financially after the September 11, 2001 terrorist attacks, but government grants and incentives helped the area rebound fairly quickly. The Tribeca Film Festival was established to help contribute to the long-term recovery of lower Manhattan after 9/11. The festival also celebrates New York City as a major filmmaking center. The mission of the film festival is "to enable the international film community and the general public to experience the power of film by redefining the film festival experience." Tribeca is a popular filming location for movies and television shows.

By the early 21st century, Tribeca became one of Manhattan's most fashionable and desirable neighborhoods, well known for its celebrity residents.  Its streets teem with art galleries, boutique shops, restaurants, and bars. In 2006, Forbes magazine ranked its 10013 zip code as New York City's most expensive (however, the adjacent, low-income neighborhood of Chinatown, also uses the 10013 zip code). , Tribeca was the safest neighborhood in New York City, according to NYPD and CompStat statistics. In the 2010s, several skyscrapers were completed, including 30 Park Place (containing the Four Seasons Hotel New York Downtown), 56 Leonard Street, and 111 Murray Street.

Demographics

For census purposes, the New York City government classifies Tribeca as part of a larger neighborhood tabulation area called SoHo-TriBeCa-Civic Center-Little Italy. Based on data from the 2010 United States Census, the population of SoHo-TriBeCa-Civic Center-Little Italy  was 42,742, a change of 5,985 (14%) from the 36,757 counted in 2000. The racial makeup of the neighborhood was 66.1% (28,250) White, 2.2% (934) African American, 0.1% (30) Native American, 22.2% (9,478) Asian, 0% (11) Pacific Islander, 0.4% (171) from other races, and 2.6% (1,098) from two or more races. Hispanic or Latino of any race were 6.5% (2,770) of the population.

The entirety of Community District 1, which comprises Tribeca and other Lower Manhattan neighborhoods, had 63,383 inhabitants as of NYC Health's 2018 Community Health Profile, with an average life expectancy of 85.8 years. This is higher than the median life expectancy of 81.2 for all New York City neighborhoods. Most inhabitants are young to middle-aged adults: half (50%) are between the ages of 25–44, while 14% are between 0–17, and 18% between 45–64. The ratio of college-aged and elderly residents was lower, at 11% and 7% respectively.

As of 2017, the median household income in Community Districts 1 and 2 (including Greenwich Village and SoHo) was $144,878, though the median income in Battery Park City individually was $126,771. In 2018, an estimated 9% of Tribeca and Lower Manhattan residents lived in poverty, compared to 14% in all of Manhattan and 20% in all of New York City. One in twenty-five residents (4%) were unemployed, compared to 7% in Manhattan and 9% in New York City. Rent burden, or the percentage of residents who have difficulty paying their rent, is 38% in Tribeca and Lower Manhattan, compared to the boroughwide and citywide rates of 45% and 51% respectively. Based on this calculation, Tribeca and Lower Manhattan are considered high-income relative to the rest of the city and not gentrifying.

Places

Tribeca is dominated by former industrial buildings that have been converted into residential buildings and lofts, similar to those of the neighboring SoHo-Cast Iron Historic District.  In the 19th and early 20th centuries, the neighborhood was a center of the textile/cotton trade.

Notable buildings in the neighborhoods include the historic neo-Renaissance Textile Building, designed by Henry J. Hardenbergh and built in 1901, and the Powell Building, a designated Landmark on Hudson Street, which was designed by Carrère and Hastings and built in 1892. Other notable buildings include the New York Telephone Company building at 140 West Street, between Vesey and Barclay, with its Mayan-inspired Art Deco motif, and the former New York Mercantile Exchange at 6 Harrison Street.

During the late 1960s and 1970s, abandoned and inexpensive Tribeca lofts became hot-spot residences for young artists and their families because of the seclusion of lower Manhattan and the vast living space. Jim Stratton, a Tribeca resident since this period, wrote the 1977 nonfiction book entitled Pioneering in the Urban Wilderness, detailing his experiences renovating lower Manhattan warehouses into residences.

 32 Avenue of the Americas, an Art Deco building, is the former site of the AT&T Long Lines division.
 388 Greenwich Street, an office building near the northwestern corner of Tribeca, is the headquarters of the corporate and investment banking arm of financial services corporation Citigroup.
 Borough of Manhattan Community College (BMCC) is part of the City University of New York.  The college campus is located between Chambers Street and N. Moore Street, spanning four blocks.  BMCC's Fiterman Hall, severely damaged in the September 11, 2001, attacks, was demolished and has been rebuilt.
  Holland Tunnel connecting New York to New Jersey has its entrances and exits in the northwest corner of Tribeca, centered around St. John's Park.
 Hook & Ladder Company No. 8, a still-in-use firehouse at North Moore Street, was the site of the filming of the Ghostbusters movies. Memorabilia from the movies is displayed inside. Another film, Hitch, with Will Smith, also filmed a short but notable scene at the firehouse.
 Hudson River Park, a waterside park on the Hudson River, it extends from 59th Street south to Battery Park. It runs through the Manhattan neighborhoods of Lower Manhattan, Battery Park City, TriBeCa, Greenwich Village, Gansevoort Market (The Meatpacking District), Chelsea, Midtown West, Hudson Yards, and Hell's Kitchen (Clinton). It is a joint New York State and New York City collaboration and is a  park, the biggest in Manhattan after Central Park.  The park arose as part of the West Side Highway replacement project in the wake of the abandoned Westway plan.
 Kitchen, Montross & Wilcox Store, a landmarked building in Tribeca, was built in 1861.
 Metropolitan College of New York, a private, independent educational institution, is located on Canal Street.
 New York Academy of Art, a private, graduate art school that focuses on technical training and critical discourse.
 New York Law School, a private, independent law school, was founded in 1891, and has been located in several buildings in Tribeca since 1962, principally along Worth Street between Church Street and West Broadway.
 Nutopian Embassy, Located at 1 White Street (at the corner of White Street and W Broadway), this landmark townhouse building is known as the embassy location of John Lennon and Yoko Ono's conceptual country of Nutopia. It was built sometime between 1805 and 1825 and has been used as both a townhouse residence as well as a cafe space. The building in its entirety is now being used as a restaurant. 
 Stuyvesant High School, one of the nine specialized high schools in New York City, is located at 345 Chambers Street in nearby Battery Park City. The Tribeca Bridge was built to assure the safety of the students who need to get across West Street to get to the building.
 Verizon Building, a landmarked building in Tribeca, was built between 1923 and 1927. It was converted into condominiums in 2016.
 Washington Market Park, bounded by Greenwich, Chambers, and West Streets, is a  park that is popular with children for its large playground.  The park also has community gardens and hosts community events.

Historic districts

Four New York City Landmarks Preservation Commission-designated four historic districts within Tribeca in 1991 and 1992 as well as an extension of one in 2002:
 Tribeca Westdesignated 
 Tribeca Eastdesignated 
 Tribeca Northdesignated 
 Tribeca Southdesignated 
 Tribeca South Extensiondesignated

Police and crime

Tribeca and Lower Manhattan are patrolled by the 1st Precinct of the NYPD, located at 16 Ericsson Place. The 1st Precinct ranked 63rd safest out of 69 patrol areas for per-capita crime in 2010. Though the number of crimes is low compared to other NYPD precincts, the residential population is also much lower. , with a non-fatal assault rate of 24 per 100,000 people, Tribeca and Lower Manhattan's rate of violent crimes per capita is less than that of the city as a whole. The incarceration rate of 152 per 100,000 people is lower than that of the city as a whole.

The 1st Precinct has a lower crime rate than in the 1990s, with crimes across all categories having decreased by 86.3% between 1990 and 2018. The precinct reported 1 murder, 23 rapes, 80 robberies, 61 felony assaults, 85 burglaries, 1,085 grand larcenies, and 21 grand larcenies auto in 2018.

Fire safety

Tribeca is served by two New York City Fire Department (FDNY) fire stations. Engine Co. 7/Ladder Co. 1/Battalion 1 is located at 100 Duane Street while Ladder Co. 8, which appears in the Ghostbusters films, is located at 14 North Moore Street.

Health
, preterm births and births to teenage mothers are less common in Tribeca and Lower Manhattan than in other places citywide. In Tribeca and Lower Manhattan, there were 77 preterm births per 1,000 live births (compared to 87 per 1,000 citywide), and 2.2 births to teenage mothers per 1,000 live births (compared to 19.3 per 1,000 citywide), though the teenage birth rate is based on a small sample size. Tribeca and Lower Manhattan have a low population of residents who are uninsured. In 2018, this population of uninsured residents was estimated to be 4%, less than the citywide rate of 12%, though this was based on a small sample size.

Sixteen percent of Tribeca and Lower Manhattan residents are smokers, which is more than the city average of 14% of residents being smokers. In Tribeca and Lower Manhattan, 4% of residents are obese, 3% are diabetic, and 15% have high blood pressure, the lowest rates in the city—compared to the citywide averages of 24%, 11%, and 28% respectively. In addition, 5% of children are obese, the lowest rate in the city, compared to the citywide average of 20%.

Ninety-six percent of residents eat some fruits and vegetables every day, which is more than the city's average of 87%. In 2018, 88% of residents described their health as "good," "very good," or "excellent," more than the city's average of 78%. For every supermarket in Tribeca and Lower Manhattan, there are 6 bodegas.

The nearest major hospital is NewYork-Presbyterian Lower Manhattan Hospital in the Civic Center area.

Post offices and ZIP Codes

Tribeca is located within two primary ZIP Codes. Most of the neighborhood is covered by 10013, but the southernmost blocks are located in 10007, and the Jacob K. Javits Federal Building is located in 10278. The United States Postal Service operates two post offices near Tribeca: the Federal Plaza Station at 26 Federal Plaza and the Canal Street Station at 350 Canal Street.

Education 
Tribeca and Lower Manhattan generally have a higher rate of college-educated residents than the rest of the city . The vast majority of residents age 25 and older (84%) have a college education or higher, while 4% have less than a high school education and 12% are high school graduates or have some college education. By contrast, 64% of Manhattan residents and 43% of city residents have a college education or higher. The percentage of Tribeca and Lower Manhattan students excelling in math rose from 61% in 2000 to 80% in 2011, and reading achievement increased from 66% to 68% during the same time period.

Tribeca and Lower Manhattan's rate of elementary school student absenteeism is lower than the rest of New York City. In Tribeca and Lower Manhattan, 6% of elementary school students missed twenty or more days per school year, less than the citywide average of 20%. Additionally, 96% of high school students in Tribeca and Lower Manhattan graduate on time, more than the citywide average of 75%.

Schools
The New York City Department of Education operates the following public schools nearby:

 PS 150 (grades PK-5)
 PS 234 Independence School (grades K-5)

Libraries
The New York Public Library (NYPL) operates two branches nearby. The New Amsterdam branch is located at 9 Murray Street near Broadway. It was established on the ground floor of an office building in 1989. The Battery Park City branch is located at 175 North End Avenue near Murray Street. Completed in 2010, the two-story branch is NYPL's first LEED-certified branch.

Notable people

Edward Albee (1928-2016), playwright
Laurie Anderson (born 1947), artist
Arman (1928-2005), artist
 Karole Armitage (born 1954) dancer and choreographer
Robert Ashley (1930-2014), composer
Bill Barrett (born 1934), artist
Paul Bettany (born 1971), actor
 Kate Betts (born 1964), fashion journalist.
Beyoncé (born 1981), singer / songwriter
Jessica Biel (born 1982), actress.
Robert Bingham (1966-1999), writer.
Ross Bleckner (born 1949), artist
Eric Bogosian (born 1953), actor.
Edward Burns (born 1968), actor
Mariah Carey (born 1969), singer / songwriter
Jennifer Connelly (born 1970), actress
Daniel Craig (born 1968), actor
Billy Crystal (born 1948), actor and comedian
Robert De Niro (born 1943), actor, producer and director
Carroll Dunham (born 1949), painter
Lena Dunham (born 1986), actress, writer, producer and director best known for the HBO series Girls.
Elvis Duran (born 1964), radio personality
 Kyle Eastwood (born 1968), jazz bass musician
The Edge (born 1961), musician and songwriter best known as the lead guitarist, keyboardist and backing vocalist of U2
Fredrik Eklund (born 1977), real estate broker and Bravo TV reality star.
Mark Epstein (born 1953), author and psychotherapist, integrating both Buddha's and Sigmund Freud's approaches to trauma, who writes about their interplay.
Marisol Escobar (1930-2016), sculptor
Jared Followill (born 1986), bass guitarist of Kings of Leon
Kat Foster (born 1978), actress
Bethenny Frankel (born 1970), TV personality
Marián Gáborík (born 1982), ice hockey right winger currently playing for the Los Angeles Kings
Dave Gahan (born 1962), singer of Depeche Mode
James Gandolfini (1961-2013), actor.
Sarah Michelle Gellar (born 1977), actress, producer and entrepreneur
Heather Graham (born 1970), actress, director and writer
Red Grooms (born 1937), multimedia artist best known for his colorful pop-art constructions depicting frenetic scenes of modern urban life
Don Gummer (born 1946), sculptor
Savannah Guthrie (born 1971), broadcast journalist and attorney; a main co-anchor of the NBC News morning show Today
Richard Handler
Hanson
Mariska Hargitay
Josh Hartnett
James Havard (1937-2020), painter and sculptor
Peter Hermann
Grace Hightower
Bob Holman, poet and poetry activist
Paz de la Huerta
Chanel Iman
Michael Imperioli
Jay-Z (born 1969), rapper and businessman
Richard Jefferson
Derek Jeter, baseball player
Mimi Johnson, arts administrator
Harvey Keitel
Carolyn Bessette-Kennedy (deceased)
John F. Kennedy Jr. (deceased)
Daniel Kessler
Kid Cudi
Karolina Kurkova
Ronnie Landfield (born 1947), artist
David Letterman
Jodi Long
Adrian Lyne
Neal Marshad (born 1952), film and television producer.
Chris Martin (born 1972), musician, singer, songwriter, record producer and philanthropist.
Danny Masterson
Mike McCready
Shane McMahon
Debra Messing
Taylor Momsen
Toni Morrison (1931-2019), novelist.
Sean Murray
Casey Neistat
Petra Němcová
Gwyneth Paltrow (born 1972), actress, singer and food writer
Richard Parsons (born 1948), former CEO of Citigroup
Jean Passanante
Mizuo Peck
Mike Piazza, baseball player
Amy Poehler (born 1971), actress, comedian, director, producer and writer.
Jane Pratt (born 1962), founding editor of Sassy and Jane
Rammellzee (1960-2010), visual artist, graffiti writer and performance artist.
Norman Reedus
Lou Reed (1942-2013), musician, singer / songwriter who was the guitarist, vocalist, and principal songwriter of The Velvet Underground
Steve Reich (born 1936), composer
Roger Rees (1944-2015), actor and director
Brad Richards (born 1980), retired hockey player who played in the NHL for the New York Rangers
Kelly Ripa (born 1970), talk show host and television producer
David O. Russell
Juan Samuel, baseball player
Richard Serra
John Shaw (1948-2019), painter and printmaker
Jake Shears (born 1978), singer and songwriter best known as the lead male singer for the band Scissor Sisters.
Arlene Shechet (born 1951), artist
Duncan Sheik (born 1969), singer-songwriter and composer
M. Night Shyamalan
Laurie Simmons (born 1949), artist, photographer and filmmaker.
Gary Sinise (born 1955), actor, director, musician, producer and philanthropist
Shane Smith (born 1969), journalist and media executive. who is co-founder and Executive Chairman of Vice Media
Laurie Spiegel (born 1945), composer
George Steel, musician who was General Manager and Artistic Director of New York City Opera
Alexis Stewart (born 1965), television host and radio personality
Jon Stewart
Michael Stipe
Dominique Strauss-Kahn
Meryl Streep, actress
Taylor Swift (born 1989), singer-songwriter and actress
Bob Telson (born 1949), composer, songwriter and pianist
Uma Thurman (born 1970), actress and model
Justin Timberlake (born 1981), singer-songwriter, actor and record producer.
Christy Turlington (born 1969),  model, charity-founder / campaigner and filmmaker
Richard Tuttle (born 1941), postminimalist artist
Neil deGrasse Tyson (born 1958), astrophysicist, author, and science communicator
Mo Vaughn (born 1967), former Major League Baseball first baseman
Cecilia Vicuña (born 1948), contemporary poet
Lauren Weisberger (born 1977), novelist and author of the 2003 bestseller The Devil Wears Prada
Jack Whitten (1939-2018), artist 
Kate Winslet (born 1975), actress and singer
Dean Winters (born 1964), actor best known for his role as Ryan O'Reily on the HBO prison drama Oz
Warner Wolf (born 1937), sportscaster
Christopher Woodrow (born 1977),  financier and film producer
La Monte Young (born 1935), avant-garde composer, musician, and artist

Robert De Niro and Jane Rosenthal had high profiles in the district's revival when they co-produced the dramatic television anthology series TriBeCa in 1993 and co-founded the annual Tribeca Film Festival in 2002. De Niro also claimed ownership of all domain names incorporating the text "Tribeca" for domain names with any content related to film festivals. In particular, he had a dispute with the owner of the website tribeca.net.

In popular culture
Although Wizards of Waverly Place includes a fictional "Tribeca Prep," exterior shots were filmed at P.S. 40 on East 20th Street, between First Avenue and Second Avenue in midtown Gramercy Park. In addition, a fictional "Tribeca High School" appears in the Law & Order: Special Victims Unit episode "Granting Immunity." Local radio station WHTZ's studio is located here. In the third book of the Witches of East End series, Winds of Salem, the Oracle, an almighty god from Asgard, lives in Tribeca.

The Subaru Tribeca, which went into production in 2005, and was discontinued being sold in the United States in 2012, was an automobile named after the neighborhood.

See also

References

External links

Community groups and organizations
 Tribeca Film Festival
 Tribeca Trust - a community organization working on historic preservation and public spaces

Images and memories
 Tribeca in the 1970s – Early photos of the neighborhood
 Tribeca through history – Requiem For A Living City: Notes On A Home In Tribeca
Neighborhood guides
 tribeca.org – Neighborhood history, dining, shopping, arts and entertainments (maintained by the Tribeca Organization)
 Tribeca Family Festival
 Tribeca Neighborhood Profile – About.com
 Tribeca Open Artist Studio Tour (TOAST)
 Tribeca Art Night
 Tribeca Walking Tour

News and blogs
 The Tribeca Trib – neighborhood newspaper in circulation since 1994
 Tribecan – Daily online magazine dedicated exclusively to Tribeca
 Battery Park Blog - Covering Battery Park City, the Financial District, and Tribeca
 The Battery Park City Broadsheet - Local news throughout Battery Park City, Tribeca, South Street Seaport and the Financial District
 Downtown Express – Weekly, local newspaper of Lower Manhattan
 The Tribeca Citizen – Online local newspaper covering Tribeca, Battery Park City, the Financial District, and east of Broadway

 
Economy of New York City
Neighborhoods in Manhattan
Warehouse districts of the United States